Lake Rotokawau is a dune lake on the Karikari Peninsula in the Far North District of New Zealand. It is northeast of Rangiputa village and near Puwheke Beach. It is sometimes referred to as 'Lake Rotokawau West' and is the larger of two adjacent lakes.

The lake has no inflows or outflows. The surrounding catchment is pasture and kanuka/manuka scrub, with pohutukawa forest to the north of the lake.

References

External links
Karikari Peninsula – Department of Conservation 

Far North District
Rotokawau Lake Karikari Peninsula